Centrodoras is a small genus of thorny catfishes found in the Amazon basin of South America.

Species 
There are currently two described species in this genus:
 Centrodoras brachiatus (Cope, 1872)
 Centrodoras hasemani (Steindachner, 1915)

References

Doradidae
Fish of South America
Catfish genera
Taxa named by Carl H. Eigenmann
Freshwater fish genera